Our Daily Bread (German: Unser täglich Brot) is a 1926 German silent drama film directed by Constantin J. David and starring Fritz Kampers, Mary Nolan and Dina Gralla.

The film's sets were designed by Karl Machus.

Cast
 Fritz Kampers 
 Mary Nolan as The school teacher  
 Dina Gralla 
 Elza Temary 
 Harry Nestor 
 Leona Bergere 
 Paul Rehkopf
 Paul Hartmann as Overseer 
 Hans Mierendorff as Tagger

References

Bibliography
 Hans-Michael Bock and Tim Bergfelder. The Concise Cinegraph: An Encyclopedia of German Cinema. Berghahn Books.

External links

1926 films
Films of the Weimar Republic
German silent feature films
Films directed by Constantin J. David
German black-and-white films
German drama films
1926 drama films
Silent drama films
1920s German films
1920s German-language films